Nugget Mountain is a  glaciated mountain summit located in the Boundary Ranges of the Coast Mountains, in the U.S. state of Alaska.

Location 
Nugget Mountain is set south of the head of the Nugget Glacier, and west of Norris Glacier, on land managed by Tongass National Forest. Nugget Creek and Lemon Creek drain precipitation runoff from the west and south slopes of the peak. This peak's local name was published in 1962 by the U.S. Geological Survey.

Climate
Based on the Köppen climate classification, Nugget Mountain is located in a subarctic climate zone, with long, cold, snowy winters, and cool summers. Weather systems coming off the Gulf of Alaska are forced upwards by the Coast Mountains (orographic lift), causing heavy precipitation in the form of rainfall and snowfall. Temperatures can drop below −20 °C with wind chill factors below −30 °C. The month of July offers the most favorable weather to view or climb Nugget Mountain.

See also

Geospatial summary of the High Peaks/Summits of the Juneau Icefield
Geography of Alaska
Nugget Towers

References

External links
 Nugget Mountain weather forecast

              

Mountains of Alaska
Mountains of Juneau, Alaska
Boundary Ranges